Falaye Sacko (born 1 May 1995) is a Malian professional footballer who plays as a right-back for  club Montpellier, on loan from Primeira Liga club Vitória de Guimarães, and the Mali national team.

Club career
Sacko made his professional debut in the Segunda Liga for Vitória de Guimarães B on 17 February 2016 in a game against Atlético CP.

On 31 January 2022, the last day of the Portuguese transfer window, Sacko was loaned to Saint-Étienne. On 1 July 2022, he joined Montpellier on loan for the season.

International career
Sacko made his international debut for the Mali national team in a 1–1 friendly tie with Japan on 23 March 2018.

Career statistics

Scores and results list Mali's goal tally first, score column indicates score after each Sacko goal.

References

External links
 

Living people
1995 births
Sportspeople from Bamako
Malian footballers
Association football defenders
Mali international footballers
Djoliba AC players
Vitória S.C. B players
Liga Portugal 2 players
Vitória S.C. players
AS Saint-Étienne players
Montpellier HSC players
Primeira Liga players
Ligue 1 players
2019 Africa Cup of Nations players
2021 Africa Cup of Nations players
21st-century Malian people
Malian expatriate footballers
Malian expatriate sportspeople in Hungary
Expatriate footballers in Hungary
Malian expatriate sportspeople in Belgium
Expatriate footballers in Belgium
Malian expatriate sportspeople in Portugal
Expatriate footballers in Portugal
Malian expatriate sportspeople in France
Expatriate footballers in France